Frances E. Nealy (October 14, 1918 – May 23, 1997) was an American actress and dancer. She starred in Harold Robbins' 79 Park Avenue.

She was born Frances Elizabeth Warner, the only child of Milton Warner and Elizabeth Bowen Warner, in San Diego. Nealy, who began tap dancing when she was 15, was once billed as "The Female Bill Robinson". She arrived in Hollywood in 1939 and performed at the Club Alabam with other black entertainers. By that time, "The biggest part of the black heyday in Hollywood was over," she said.

In 1968, she performed in "New Sole Sisters", a multi-generational production of female dancers.

In the 1980s, Nealy had her own studio, where she taught tap dancing.

Filmography

References

External links

1918 births
1997 deaths
20th-century American actresses
Actresses from San Diego
American female dancers
American film actresses
American musical theatre actresses
American tap dancers
Musicians from San Diego